Finn Helgesen (25 April 1919 – 3 September 2011) was a speed skater from Norway.

Career 
Competing in the 500 m he won the national title in 1947 and 1949 and an Olympic gold medal in 1948. In 1948 he set a new Olympic record at 43.1 seconds, a mere 0.1 seconds ahead of three skaters who placed second. At the 1952 Winter Olympics in Oslo, Helgesen and two other skaters had a time of 44.0 seconds on the 500 m, a time good enough for bronze, but because Helgesen had lost in the heats against one of those two skaters, he was ranked fifth. Note that times were measured to a precision of only one-tenth of a second in those days – at the speeds on the 500 m, it was possible for two skaters to finish in the same time, while one of them finished more than one meter ahead of the other. Meanwhile, the speed was such that in one tenth of second skaters covered more than one meter.

Helgesen skated for Oslo Skøiteklub ("Oslo Skating Club"), together with many other famous Norwegian skaters: Roald Aas, Ivar Ballangrud, Bernt Evensen, Rudolf Gundersen, Oscar Mathisen, and Laila Schou Nilsen, amongst others.

Personal life 
He was born in Drammen as seventh out of ten siblings, but when he was seven years old his family moved to Strømmen, an industrial site next to Oslo. He was a promising young skater, placing third over 500 m at the national junior championships in 1940, but his career was interrupted by World War II. In 1942 he married and had a daughter. His wife died from tuberculosis three years later, and he moved to his parents' house. He remarried in 1953, and had two more daughters and one son. Helgesen retired from competition in 1956 and became a speed skating coach at his club Oslo Skøiteklub. He also worked as a mechanic, first at Strømmen Værksted until 1960 and then at the Institute for Energy Technology.

Personal records
To put these personal records in perspective, the WR column lists the official world records on the dates that Helgesen skated his personal records.

Helgesen has an Adelskalender score of 202.046 points.

References

1919 births
2011 deaths
Norwegian male speed skaters
Olympic speed skaters of Norway
Olympic gold medalists for Norway
Speed skaters at the 1948 Winter Olympics
Speed skaters at the 1952 Winter Olympics
Olympic medalists in speed skating
Medalists at the 1948 Winter Olympics
Sportspeople from Drammen
20th-century Norwegian people